Esko Ensio ”Sir Emal” Karhunen (4 January 1928 – 8 March 2016) was a Finnish basketball player and contributor. 

The  Karhunen spent his whole SM-sarja career at Pantterit basketball club, and its predecessors, in Helsinki, and was in a record 13 Finnish championship-winning teams. He was also capped eight times for the Finland men's national team and represented his country at the 1952 Summer Olympics in Helsinki. 

After his career as a player, Karhunen was a basketball contributor   in Pantterit. He organized a practise tournament which was played between 1971–2000 and brought the Harlem Globetrotters to Finland.

Karhunen was inducted into the Finnish Basketball Hall of Fame in 2012. Karhunen died on 8 March 2016 in Helsinki at 88 years of age.

References

External links
 
 
 

1928 births
2016 deaths
Basketball players at the 1952 Summer Olympics
Finnish men's basketball players
Olympic basketball players of Finland
Sportspeople from Helsinki